The Câlnău is a left tributary of the river Buzău in Romania. It discharges into the Buzău in Gura Câlnăului, near the city Buzău. The upper reach of the river is also known as Salcia. The following villages are situated along the river Câlnău, from source to mouth: Valea Salciei, Modreni, Costomiru, Batogu, Murgești, Racovițeni, Petrișoru, Vadu Sorești, Fundeni, Zărnești, Sudiți, Coconari, Aliceni, Zilișteanca, Poșta Câlnău, Potârnichești and Gura Câlnăului.

Tributaries

The following rivers are tributaries to the river Câlnău:

Left: Costomiru, Valea lui Lalu, Iernatic, Valea Șchiopului, Chiperu, Rața
Right: Chiperișteni, Hârboca, Ghizdita, Cheia

References

Rivers of Romania
Rivers of Buzău County